The 2016 National Premier Leagues was the fourth season of the Australian National Premier Leagues football competition. The league competition was played amongst eight separate divisions, divided by FFA state and territory member federations. The divisions are ACT, NSW, Northern NSW, Queensland, South Australia, Tasmania, Victoria and Western Australia.

The winners of each respective divisional league competed in a finals playoff tournament at season end, with Sydney United 58 crowned as Champions, which gave them direct qualification for the 2017 FFA Cup Round of 32.

League tables

ACT

Finals

NSW

Finals

Northern NSW

Finals

Queensland

Finals

South Australia

Finals

Tasmania

Finals

Victoria

Finals

Western Australia

Finals

Final Series
The winner of each league competition (top of the table) in the NPL competed in a single match knockout tournament to decide the National Premier Leagues Champion for 2016. Unlike previous years, the participants were not matched up based on geographical proximity, instead an open draw was used to determine the match ups and hosting of quarter finals. Hosting of the semi-finals and final was based on a formula relating to time of winning (normal time, extra time or penalties), goals scored and allowed, and yellow/red cards. The winner also qualified for the 2017 FFA Cup Round of 32.

Quarter-finals

Semi-finals

Grand Final

Individual honours
Glen Trifiro from Sydney United 58 won the John Kosmina Medal for the best player in the NPL Grand Final.

References

External links
 Official website

2016
2016 domestic association football leagues
2016 in Australian soccer